Alsodes norae is a species of frog in the family Alsodidae endemic to the Chilean Coast Range in the Valdivia Province, Chile. It is only known from the type series collected from a temperate Nothofagus forest. The threats are not formally known but it may be ongoing deforestation, however, the species may be protected by Oncol Park.

References

norae
Endemic fauna of Chile
Amphibians of Chile
Amphibians described in 2008